Platonic theology can refer to:
The theological theories of the Greek philosopher Plato or other such theories within Platonism.
The work Theologia Platonica by the ancient philosopher Proclus.
The work Platonic Theology (Ficino) (Latin: Theologia Platonica; subtitle: de immortalitate animae) by the Renaissance philosopher Marsilio Ficino.